BP Cooper is an American screenwriter, film and commercial producer. He is best known for co-writing and producing the hit indie film Time Lapse, directed by Bradley D. King and starring Danielle Panabaker.

In commercials he produced the AT&T "It's Not Complicated" campaign directed by Jorma Taccone and starring SNL actor Beck Bennet where he interviews kids. Cooper also produced the K-Swiss campaign starring Danny McBride's fictional character of Kenny Powers as the disruptive CEO of the company.

Awards

Best screenplay
Best Screenplay at the Maverick Movie Awards (2014, won)
Best Screenplay at the Orlando Film Festival (2014, won)
Best Screenplay at the Other Worlds Austin (2014, won)

International
Best International Screenplay at the Rojo Sangre Film Festival (2014, won)

References

External links
Official Time Lapse Website
BP Cooper and Bradley King Slashfilm Interview: "The Challenges of Making a Time-Travel Thriller"
AT&T: It's Not Complicated Halloween
Sit-down with a Director: Jorma Taccone on AT&T's 'It's Not Complicated'
Webby Awards
Kenny Powers Unveils Fastest Shoe You've Ever Seen K-Swiss Blades

American male screenwriters
Living people
Year of birth missing (living people)